Zanolimumab (expected trade name HuMax-CD4) is a human monoclonal antibody and an immunosuppressive drug. It was developed with the goal of treatment of rheumatoid arthritis, psoriasis, melanoma, cutaneous and peripheral T-cell lymphoma. Development of the drug was ultimately discontinued with termination of all trials.

References 

Monoclonal antibodies